Dagningen was a Norwegian newspaper, published in Lillehammer in Oppland county.

History and profile
Dagningen was started in 1924. The paper was affiliated with the Labour Party. It had its headquarters in Lillehammer.

In 1997 the paper merged with Gudbrandsdølen Lillehammer Tilskuer— itself a 1990 merger between Gudbrandsdølen and Lillehammer Tilskuer—to form Gudbrandsdølen Dagningen (GD).

References

1924 establishments in Norway
1997 disestablishments in Norway
Defunct newspapers published in Norway
Labour Party (Norway) newspapers
Mass media in Lillehammer
Newspapers established in 1924
Norwegian-language newspapers
Publications disestablished in 1997